Tyrone Township is a civil township of Livingston County in the U.S. state of Michigan. The population was 10,020 at the 2010 census, up from 8,459 at the 2000 census.

The township was named after County Tyrone in Northern Ireland.

Communities
Hallers Corners is an unincorporated community at the border with Hartland Township at Denton Hill and Holtforth roads.().
Tyrone Center is an unincorporated community at Foley and Hartland roads.

Geography
Tyrone Township occupies the northeast corner of Livingston County, bordered to the north by Genesee County and to the east by Oakland County. U.S. Route 23 crosses the township, with access from Exits 75 and 77. US 23 leads north  to Flint and south  to Ann Arbor.

Tyrone Township is home to the Sergeant Patrick O' Rourke Memorial Highway, a highway honoring West Bloomfield Officer Patrick O' Rourke, who was killed in the line of duty.

Demographics
As of the census of 2000, there were 8,459 people, 2,882 households, and 2,466 families residing in the township. The racial makeup of the township was 97.81% White, 0.06% African American, 0.40% Native American, 0.61% Asian, 0.25% from other races, and 0.86% from two or more races. Hispanic or Latino of any race were 0.96% of the population.

There were 2,882 households, out of which 40.7% had children under the age of 18 living with them, 78.5% were married couples living together, 4.3% had a female householder with no husband present, and 14.4% were non-families. 11.7% of all households were made up of individuals, and 3.6% had someone living alone who was 65 years of age or older.  The average household size was 2.93 and the average family size was 3.18.

In the township, the population was spread out, with 28.8% under the age of 18, 5.5% from 18 to 24, 28.7% from 25 to 44, 29.3% from 45 to 64, and 7.8% who were 65 years of age or older.  The median age was 39 years. For every 100 females, there were 101.8 males.  For every 100 females age 18 and over, there were 102.4 males.

The median income for a household in the township was $75,994, and the median income for a family was $82,307. Males had a median income of $60,760 versus $35,071 for females. The per capita income for the township was $29,292.  About 3.7% of families and 4.2% of the population were below the poverty line, including 6.2% of those under age 18 and 2.1% of those age 65 or over.

Government

The township is in the following electoral districts:
State House District 47
State Senate District 22
US Congressional District 8
County Commission districts 3 and 4

The township is within the following governmental service districts:
Genesee District Library
Cromaine District Library
Fenton Area Public Schools
Hartland Consolidated Schools
Linden Community Schools

References

External links
Official website

Townships in Livingston County, Michigan
Townships in Michigan